Polichne was a town of ancient Naxos, mentioned by ancient inscriptions.

Its precise site is unlocated.

References

Populated places in the ancient Aegean islands
Former populated places in Greece
Ancient Naxos